iCarly 2: iJoin the Click! is a 2010 video game loosely based on the TV series of the same name. It is the sequel to the original iCarly game.

Development and release 
iCarly 2 was announced in July 2010. It was developed by Big Blue Bubble, a company which had previously worked on a Windows game called iCarly: iDream in Toons in 2009.

The game was released for the Wii and Nintendo DS in the US on November 16, 2010, along with a line of iCarly toys from Playmates with in-game codes. In a press release, actors from the cast of the show remarked on the game, with Nathan Kress saying the game has "a much more in-depth feel" than the original installment. Miranda Cosgrove said: "It's so exciting to see the end results for the video game and hear my own voice come from my animated character."

Gameplay
Players begin as a new student at Ridgeway Secondary School. They can interact with main characters Carly, Sam and Freddie at locations from the show, such as Groovy Smoothie, the Pacific Place Mall, and Carly's apartment. Gameplay is not the same as the original, with the player being able to create an avatar who can explore an open world from a third-person perspective. While the main cast of Carly, Sam, Freddie, Spencer, and Gibby are voice acted, the rest of the characters speak in gibberish.

Reception
iCarly 2, like its predecessor, released to limited critical reception, receiving no Metascore for either platform on Metacritic.

Common Sense Media called iCarly 2 "a messy, sometimes incomprehensible mish-mash of a game", citing its dialogue as the only redeeming quality for fans of the show.

References

External links 

 iCarly 2: iJoin the Click! at MobyGames
 iCarly 2 at Speedrun.com

2010 video games
Activision games
Nickelodeon video games
Nintendo DS games
ICarly
Video games based on television series
Video games scored by Adam Gubman
Video games set in the 2000s
Video games set in Seattle
Video games developed in Canada
Video games featuring female protagonists
Wii games
Big Blue Bubble games
Single-player video games
Video games developed in the United States